The Global Liberal Arts Alliance is an association of liberal arts colleges around the world. It was established in 2009.  The goal of the consortium is to provide an international framework for cooperation among institutions following the American liberal arts college model.

The Alliance is administered by the Great Lakes Colleges Association, a consortium of thirteen American liberal arts colleges in the Great Lakes region.

Member institutions
Al Akhawayn University, Morocco
Albion College, United States
Antioch College, United States
Allegheny College, United States
American College of Greece, Greece
American University in Bulgaria, Bulgaria
American University in Cairo, Egypt
American University of Beirut, Lebanon
American University of Nigeria, Nigeria
American University of Paris, France
Ashesi University, Ghana
Bratislava International School of Liberal Arts, Slovakia
Denison University, United States
DePauw University, United States
Earlham College, United States
Effat University, Saudi Arabia
Flame University, India
Forman Christian College, Pakistan
Franklin University, Switzerland
Hope College, United States
International Christian University, Japan
John Cabot University, Italy
Kalamazoo College, United States
Kenyon College, United States
Lingnan University, Hong Kong
Oberlin College, United States
Ohio Wesleyan University, United States
Wabash College, United States
College of Wooster, United States

See also
Official Website
Liberal arts college
Alliance of Asian Liberal Arts Universities
List of higher education associations and alliances

References

External links
Official site

Liberal arts colleges
International college and university associations and consortia